Natale Abbadia (11 March 1792 – 25 December 1861) was an Italian composer, harpsichordist, and conductor. Born in Genoa, Italy, he studied music at the Genoa Conservatory.

From 1831 to 1837, he taught singing in his native city and was a conductor at the Teatro Carlo Felice. He later taught singing in Milan. One of his pupils was his daughter, Luigia Abbadia, who had a successful career as an opera singer.

As a composer, Natale Abbadia wrote music for the theatre and for the church. He composed the opera Giannina di Pontieu (1812), the musical farce L'imbroglione ed il castigamatti, and several masses, motets, and other religious music. He died in Milan at the age of 69.

References

1792 births
1861 deaths
19th-century classical composers
Italian classical composers
Italian male classical composers
Italian male conductors (music)
Italian opera composers
Male opera composers
Musicians from Genoa
19th-century Italian composers
19th-century Italian male musicians